The  Chicago Rush season was the eighth season for the franchise. The Rush finished the regular season 11–5, making the playoffs again as they have in every year of their existence. They won their second consecutive Central Division title, and entered the playoffs as the top seed in the American Conference. They were eliminated from the playoffs in the Divisional round by the Grand Rapids Rampage, 41–58.

Standings

Regular Season schedule

Playoff schedule

Coaching

Final roster

Stats

Passing

Receiving

Regular season

Week 1: vs. San Jose SaberCats

Week 2: vs. Philadelphia Soul

Week 3: at Grand Rapids Rampage

Week 4: vs. Colorado Crush

Week 5: vs. Arizona Rattlers

Week 6: at Orlando Predators

Week 7: at Kansas City Brigade

Week 8: vs. Grand Rapids Rampage

Week 9: at Colorado Crush

Week 10: at Tampa Bay Storm

Week 11
Bye Week

Week 12: vs. Los Angeles Avengers

Week 13: at Utah Blaze

Week 14: vs. Kansas City Brigade

Week 15: at Cleveland Gladiators

Week 16: at Georgia Force

Week 17: vs. Dallas Desperados

Playoffs

American Conference Divisional: vs. (6) Grand Rapids Rampage

External links

Chicago Rush
Chicago Rush seasons
Chicago